Crawl to China is the fifth studio album by the American Christian metal band Tourniquet. It was initially released on Benson Records in 1997. This album took the band's music style to a more simplistic rock sound. The song "Claustrospelunker" includes bass guitarist Tim Gaines of the American Christian metal band Stryper. The lyrics of the song "The Tell-Tale Heart" are based on Edgar Allan Poe's 1843 short story of the same name. Crawl to China was later remastered by Bill Metoyer and released on Pathogenic Records in 2009; an instrumental version of "If I Was There" was included as a bonus track, the track listing was reordered, new album artwork was made by Rex Zachary, and a new booklet layout was designed with new band photos, lyric commentary, and musical notes. A music video for the title track was released in 1997.

Ted Kirkpatrick, Tourniquet's drummer, said during an interview in 2003 that the band themselves consider the album one of their favorites, although fans and critics were divisive about it when it was first released. He also said that afterwards many of the fans have begun to appreciate Crawl to China, though "the Europeans do not really seem to care for the album".

Track listing

acoustic version appears on Acoustic Archives (1998)
appears on The Slow Cosmic Voyage to Wisdom (2020)

Personnel

Tourniquet
Luke Easter - vocals
Aaron Guerra - guitars, vocals, bass guitar
Ted Kirkpatrick - drums, guitars, bass guitar

Guest musician
Tim Gaines - bass guitar on "Claustrospelunker"

Additional personnel
Produced by Bill Metoyer and Tourniquet
Mixed by Bill Metoyer
Mastered by Kevin Szymanski
Executive producer: George King
Photography: Robert Ascroft
Mastered at SkyLab Studios in Nashville, Tennessee
Recorded and mixed at Bill's Place in North Hollywood, California
Art direction and designs: Mike Rapp (1997 version)
Artwork by Rex Zachary (2009 version)

References

External links
Crawl to China at Tourniquet.net

Tourniquet (band) albums
1997 albums
Hard rock albums by American artists